City of the Beasts is the first young adult novel by Chilean-American writer Isabel Allende.  Published in 2002, the story is set in the Amazon rainforest.  The novel was translated by Margaret Sayers Peden from Spanish to English. Walden Media acquired the novel's movie rights in 2006 but no film has yet been produced.

Plot summary

Beginning

City of the Beasts begins with the story of Alexander Cold, who is 15 years old and going through a family crisis. While his parents leave for Texas to try to treat his mother's cancer, Alex and his sisters are sent to live with their grandmothers. Despite his desperate pleading, Alex is sent off to New York City to stay with his eccentric grandmother Kate Cold, a reporter for International Geographic Magazine. His sisters, however are sent to live with their other grandmother. Meanwhile, Kate announces that she will be taking Alex with her to the Amazon rainforest during his visit. Once Alex arrives in New York City, and finds out that his grandmother had no intentions of collecting him at the airport he is forced to find his own way to her apartment. In the process he meets a girl named Morgana, a homeless girl in her mid-20s. She offers him pot and steals his backpack that contained his clothes, his money and his flute. He is greatly saddened by the loss of his precious flute, but Kate gives him the flute belonging to his grandfather, musician Joseph Cold. Soon, they pack off to go to the Amazon with a professor and some photographers. The reason Kate goes is to write an article about the Beast.

Arrival at the Amazon
When Alex and his Grandmother Kate reach the jungle, they join the rest of the expedition group: Timothy Bruce (photographer); and his assistant Joel Gonzalez. Accompanying them is the famous anthropologist, Ludovic Leblanc, the beautiful Venezuelan physician Dr. Omayra Torres, who is coming along to vaccinate natives, and Cesar Santos, their Brazilian guide. Alex soon befriends Nadia Santos, Cesar's twelve-year-old daughter. They overhear parts of a conspiracy between their expedition's co-sponsor, greedy entrepreneur Mauro Carías, and Captain Ariosto, the commander of the village military. An encounter with a caged black jaguar reveals that this is Alex's totem animal, according to Nadia. Through Nadia, Alex also meets an ancient shaman named Walimai, who warns Alex and Nadia of coming danger.

The Expedition

The group leaves by boat, traveling upriver toward their destination in Eye of the World. Everyone in the group feels uncomfortable, as if someone were watching them constantly. One of the soldiers who is with them dies when he is shot by a poisoned dart. Later, Joel Gonzalez, the photographer's assistant, is attacked and nearly killed by an anaconda. After another soldier's death, this time at the hands of a Beast, they decide to send several people back with the wounded Joel Gonzalez; those are given the task to send help back to the expedition.

When they are left alone, Alex plays his grandfather's flute to relieve the tedium. The music attracts the mysterious People of the Mist, who kidnap the two children. They travel farther into the forest and arrive at a waterfall which they must climb to reach Eye of the World, the village of the People of the Mist. Due to Alex's skills in rock climbing, this isn't much of a problem for him; however, Nadia is afraid of heights. After they reach the top, Alex is sent back down again to rescue their chief, Mokarita, who had fallen and been mortally wounded. When everyone arrives at the top, they set off for the home of the People of the Mist.

The People of the Mist
When they reach the village, they are welcomed by the Natives - but their happiness is tempered by the death of Mokarita, which follows shortly after. He is given a traditional funeral, which unfortunately sends up a great amount of smoke from the pyre.  During the funeral, everyone is given a drug which reveals to Nadia her totem of the eagle. Jaguar and Eagle are initiated into the clan. Alex, being fifteen, is put through a rite of passage into manhood; during the ceremony, unusual things happen. Firstly, he turns into a jaguar, his totem; secondly, he receives a vision of his mom on  her hospital bed and he talks briefly with her.  After the ceremonies, the Shaman takes them to visit the Beasts, who live in a lair city deep within the forest. These Beasts are considered gods by the People of the Mist. Jaguar correctly assumes their city to be the famous El Dorado which is really made from fool's gold. Jaguar and Eagle embark on a journey to visit El Dorado and its inhabitants with the help of Walimai, the mystic's spirit wife who will serve as their guide. The city is located inside of an inactive volcano, and the only entrance is a confusing labyrinth of lava tunnels and caves.

The Beasts of the Amazon
Upon arrival, Alex and Nadia meet with the “Beasts”. The creatures, which look something like giant sloths, function as the living memory of the tribe by remembering long epic poems recited by Walimai and his predecessors. Fearing the capture of these ancient creatures by western scientists, they warn them to be careful of foreigners (such as the expedition group they both belonged to). In exchange for protecting them, the two children ask for gifts: Nadia the "crystal eggs" and Alex the water of life to save his mother. They both manage to get them, but only by giving up that which was really important to them. Nadia gives up the protective necklace given to her by Walimai, and Alex gives up the flute given to him.
Upon returning to the village, they discover that it has been taken over by the Expedition, Carias, and Ariosto. Just as Nadia convinces the Indios to receive vaccinations, the children realize that the vaccines are actually deadly doses of the measles virus, part of Carias's plan to destroy the Amazonian Indians. By a hair, they stop the vaccinations before the first dose is given. Karakawe, an expedition member, is revealed to be an officer of the Department for the Protection of Indigenous Peoples; he is shot by Ariosto. The Indios flee into the woods as a full-fledged gunfight breaks out. Luckily, it ends quickly. Ariosto and his soldiers take captive all of the members of the expedition. Some soldiers return with the gravely injured Carias and Dr. Torres. At night, Nadia and Alex manage to escape. With Walimai's help, the rest of the men are knocked unconscious by the smell of two of the Beasts, who also kill Ariosto. The tribe brings the rest of the expedition to safety. After the People of the Mist reach an agreement with the remaining members of the expedition (they will protect that area with all the power, influence, and money they can muster), they leave.

Last part
In the end, Eagle and Jaguar must part. She gives Alex the three "crystal eggs", which turn out to be giant diamonds. With the money gained from their sale, it was hoped that they would be able to fund a foundation to keep the World's Eye safe. Alex tells her that the best thing about the trip was meeting her, and they agree that they will be best friends forever.

Literary significance and reception
Initial reception was split between harsh criticism and approval. Some critics regarded the novel as an engaging read and a good first try at a children's book, while others note its slow start, and tedious, somewhat unconvincing speech in translation.

City of the Beasts has been translated into over 40 languages.

Awards and nominations
 San Francisco Chronicle Book Review for Nov. 17th 2002: one of the best Young Adult Science Fiction novels of 2002
Book Magazine Best of 2002 list for Young Adults
Time magazine 100 Best Young Adult Books of All Time

Sequels
Eagle and Jaguar meet again in the sequel to this book, "Kingdom of the Golden Dragon", and a third book in this series, "Forest of the Pygmies."

Notes and references

External links
The book's page on the author's website.

American young adult novels
2002 American novels
Novels by Isabel Allende
Novels set in Brazil